The Phytologist was a British botanical journal, appearing first as Phytologist: a popular botanical miscellany. It was founded in 1841 as a monthly, edited by George Luxford. Luxford died in 1854, and the title was taken over by Alexander Irvine and William Pamplin, who ran it to 1863 with subtitle "a botanical journal".

The proprietor for the first series was Edward Newman, also a contributor. The publisher was John Van Voorst. The journal never made money. Newman used its pages to attack Vestiges of Creation (1844), in an outspoken signed review that stood out from the mass of anonymous comment. Luxford's overall editorial policy, however, gave space to those supporting transmutation of species. The Phytologist, quite unofficially, became the house journal of the Botanical Society of London; and Hewett Watson of the Society a prominent contributor. In the early issues Luxford wrote a series of ten articles on myco-heterotrophy, around Monotropa hypopithys, and prompted sharp debate.

Contributors

James Backhouse (botanist, 1825–1890)
John Baker Gilbert
William Borrer 
William Arnold Bromfield
Thomas Edmondston 
Edward Forster the Younger 
George Stacey Gibson 
Samuel Gibson 
Amelia Warren Griffiths
Henry Ibbotson
Mary Kirby
George Maw (1832–1912)
William Mathews
John Stuart Mill
William Mitten
David Moore
Daniel Oliver
Edwin John Quekett
John Ralfs
John Drew Salmon
Gerard Edwards Smith
Richard Spruce
Hugh Ashworth Stowell
Thomas Taylor
George Henry Kendrick Thwaites
Hewett Cottrell Watson
Joseph Woods

New Phytologist
New Phytologist was launched by Arthur Tansley in 1902, with a conscious nod to its predecessor.

Notes

Defunct magazines published in the United Kingdom
1841 establishments in the United Kingdom
1863 disestablishments in the United Kingdom
Botany journals